Hwang Jae-Won (born 13 April 1981) is a South Korean football defender, who plays for Daejeon Citizen in the K League 2.

Club career statistics

International goals

Honours

Individual
K-League Best XI: 2007, 2009
AFC footballer of the year nomination: 2009

Club
Pohang Steelers
K-League: 2007
Korean FA Cup: 2008
K-League Cup: 2009
AFC Champions League: 2009

References

External links
 
 National Team Player Record 
 
 

1981 births
Living people
Association football defenders
South Korean footballers
South Korea international footballers
2011 AFC Asian Cup players
Pohang Steelers players
Suwon Samsung Bluewings players
Seongnam FC players
Chungju Hummel FC players
Daegu FC players
Daejeon Hana Citizen FC players
K League 1 players
K League 2 players
Ajou University alumni
Footballers from Seoul